Damien Letulle (born 3 April 1973) is a French former archer. He competed in the men's individual and team events at the 1996 Summer Olympics.

References

External links
 

1973 births
Living people
French male archers
Olympic archers of France
Archers at the 1996 Summer Olympics
People from Bayeux
Sportspeople from Calvados (department)